Sir Nicholas Richard Maybury Hilliard (born 1 May 1959) is a British judge who was the Recorder of London, an ancient and senior legal post at the Old Bailey, and before that Common Serjeant of London, the Recorder's second. He was appointed to that office in May 2013. From 6 January 2015 he was Recorder of London, the senior judge at the Old Bailey.
In October 2019 it was announced that was to be appointed as a judge of the High Court of Justice. He took up that appointment on 19 November 2019  ceasing to be Recorder of London.

Early life and education
Hilliard was educated at Bradfield College in Berkshire, and Lincoln College, Oxford. He was Called to the Bar in 1981, and was appointed as a Bencher of the Middle Temple in 2003.

Career
In 1995 Hilliard was appointed Treasury Counsel at the Central Criminal Court and served in that capacity until 2008 when he  was appointed Senior Treasury Counsel. In 2001 he was appointed as a recorder of the Crown Court and in 2003 became a Master of the Bench at the Middle Temple. Hilliard was Chairman of the Criminal Bar Association from 2005 to 2006. Hilliard was appointed Queen's Counsel in 2008. In that year he led the prosecution of  the murderers of Ben Kinsella.

Prosecutor
In 2003, he led the prosecution of the case of R v Ingram, C., Ingram, D. and Whittock, T. In 2011, on behalf of the Crown Prosecution Service, he unsuccessfully prosecuted Jonathan Rees for the 1987 murder of private investigator Daniel Morgan, who had been examining police corruption. Hilliard acknowledged the police could not be relied upon to ensure access to documents that the defence might require and the prosecution was fatally undermined as a result and Rees was discharged.

Judicial career
Hilliard was appointed a Senior Circuit Judge in 2012, making him the Resident Judge on the South Eastern Circuit, based at Woolwich Crown Court. He was subsequently appointed to the Common Serjeant of London and Recorder of London roles before he was appointed as a judge of the High Court of Justice in November 2019.

He has been a contributing editor to Archbold Criminal Pleading, Evidence and Practice since 1994.

Honourable appointments and charity
Hilliard is a Liveryman of the Worshipful Company of Feltmakers.

External links
 The Recorder of London, Nicholas Hilliard QC thanked Paul Cheston for his commitment to open justice and said he was an exemplar for court reporting.

References

1959 births
People educated at Bradfield College
Alumni of Lincoln College, Oxford
Living people
English King's Counsel
21st-century King's Counsel
Common Serjeants of London
Recorders of London
Members of the Middle Temple
Lawyers from London
20th-century British lawyers
21st-century English judges
English criminal law
International criminal law scholars
British prosecutors
Circuit judges (England and Wales)